Juho Kuosmanen (born September 30, 1979) is a Finnish film director and screenwriter. He graduated from Aalto University School of Arts, Design and Architecture in 2014. Kuosmanen's graduation film called The Painting Sellers was nominated for five Finnish film Academy Awards. (set design, screenplay, best actress, best director, best film). The Painting Sellers won the first prize in Cinéfondation in Cannes Film Festival in 2010.

Kuosmanen worked as an actor in Leea Klemola's arctic trilogy in Tampere Theatre in Kokkola and New Karleby.

Kuosmanen has also directed opera with conductors Sakari Oramo and Santtu-Matias Rouvali.

His film The Happiest Day in the Life of Olli Mäki was screened in the Un Certain Regard section at the 2016 Cannes Film Festival, where it won the top prize. The project had been developed through the TorinoFilmLab Script&Pitch programme in 2014.

In 2021, his film Compartment No. 6 shared the Cannes Grand Prix (the festival's second prize) together with Asghar Farhadi's A Hero.

Filmography
 The Happiest Day in the Life of Olli Mäki (2016)
 Compartment No. 6 (2021)

References

External links
 

Finnish film directors
1979 births
Living people